Romina Ferro (born 26 June 1980) is an Argentine football goalkeeper. She has played in her country as well as for Levante UD and Oviedo Moderno in Spain's Primera División.

She has been a member of the Argentina national team. She was the first-choice goalkeeper in the 2003 World Cup, playing all three games against Japan, Canada and Germany and in the 2006 South American Championship, which Argentina won. She started the 2007 World Cup as a reserve, but after a crushing defeat (0–11) against Germany she played the other two games against Japan and England.

References

1980 births
Living people
Footballers from Buenos Aires
Argentine women's footballers
Club Atlético River Plate (women) players
Argentine expatriate sportspeople in Spain
Expatriate women's footballers in Spain
Primera División (women) players
Levante UD Femenino players
2003 FIFA Women's World Cup players
Footballers at the 2007 Pan American Games
Pan American Games competitors for Argentina
2007 FIFA Women's World Cup players
Argentina women's international footballers
Women's association football goalkeepers
Real Oviedo (women) players